Peter Brockhoff (born 3 October 1936) is an Australian alpine skier. He competed at the 1960 Winter Olympics and the 1964 Winter Olympics.

References

1936 births
Living people
Australian male alpine skiers
Olympic alpine skiers of Australia
Alpine skiers at the 1960 Winter Olympics
Alpine skiers at the 1964 Winter Olympics
Skiers from Melbourne